Kärsämäki is a district in the Tampereentie ward of the city of Turku, in Finland. It is located to the north of the city, and consists mostly of industrial area. It also includes, however, the mainly low-density residential area of Paltta.

The current population of Kärsämäki is 2,021, and it is decreasing at an annual rate of 0.69%. 14.35% of the district's population are under 15 years old, while 18.46% are over 65. The district is much more linguistically and culturally uniform than the rest of Turku, with a linguistic makeup of 97.33% Finnish, 1.83% Swedish, and 0.84% other.

See also
 Districts of Turku
 Districts of Turku by population

Districts of Turku